The 1977 CCHA Men's Ice Hockey Tournament was the sixth CCHA Men's Ice Hockey Tournament. It was played between March 4 and March 12, 1977. All games were played at St. Louis Arena in St. Louis, Missouri, the home venue of the St. Louis Billikens. By winning the tournament, Bowling Green received the Central Collegiate Hockey Association's first invitation to play in the NCAA Division I Tournament, a first round game created to allow entrance for the CCHA.

Format
The tournament featured two rounds of play. Only the top four teams in the conference standings were eligible for postseason play. Each of the two rounds were structured so that the two teams facing one another would play two games and the winner would be decided by the goal differential totals of the combined scores. In the semifinal the first and fourth seeds and the second and third seeds were matched as opponents. The victorious teams would then compete in the finals for the conference championship. The tournament champion was invited to play in a first round game in the 1977 NCAA Division I Men's Ice Hockey Tournament.

Conference standings
Note: GP = Games played; W = Wins; L = Losses; T = Ties; PTS = Points; GF = Goals For; GA = Goals Against

Bracket

Note: * denotes overtime period(s)

Semifinals

(1) Saint Louis vs. (4) Western Michigan

(2) Bowling Green vs. (3) Ohio State

Championship

(1) Saint Louis vs. (2) Bowling Green

Tournament awards

MVP
None

References

External links
CCHA Champions
1976–77 CCHA Standings
1976–77 NCAA Standings

CCHA Men's Ice Hockey Tournament
Ccha tournament